Lee Yong-Soo is a South Korean football former player. After retirement, he became a famous football commentator.

Club career
He was founding member of FC Seoul, then known as Lucky-Goldstar Hwangso

References

 

1959 births
Living people
South Korean footballers
K League 1 players
FC Seoul players
Association footballers not categorized by position